The men's individual competition with revolver and pistol, distance 50 metres (later standardized by the IOC to the men's 50 metre pistol) was a shooting sports event held as part of the shooting at the 1912 Summer Olympics programme. It was the fourth appearance of the event, which was the only one to have been featured at every edition of the Games to that point. The competition was held on Monday, 1 July 1912. Fifty-four sport shooters from twelve nations competed. Nations were limited to 12 shooters each. The event was won by Alfred Lane of the United States, completing a double for him with the rapid fire pistol event. It was the United States' second victory in the event. Another American, Peter Dolfen, finished second. Charles Stewart of Great Britain took the bronze medal, the nation's first in the free pistol.

Background

This was the fourth appearance of what would become standardised as the men's ISSF 50 meter pistol event. The event was held at every Summer Olympics from 1896 to 1920 (except 1904, when no shooting events were held) and from 1936 to 2016; it was open to women from 1968 to 1980. 1896 and 1908 were the only Games in which the distance was not 50 metres; the former used 30 metres and the latter 50 yards.

Of the top ten shooters in 1908, only two returned: ninth-place finisher John Dietz of the United States and tenth-place finisher André Regaud of France.

Austria, Chile, Finland, Germany, Hungary, and Russia each made their debut in the event. France, Greece, and the United States each made their third appearance, tied for most of any nation.

Lane used a Smith & Wesson Perfected Model Third Model.

Competition format

The competition had each shooter fire 60 shots, in 10 series of 6 shots each, at a distance of 50 metres. The time allowed for each series was 4 minutes. The target was round, 50 centimetres in diameter, with 10 scoring rings. Scoring for each shot was up to 10 points, in increments of 1 point. The maximum score possible was 600 points. Ties were broken by countback (10s, 9s, 8s, etc.). Any revolver or pistol could be used; only open sights were allowed. Any ammunition with a metal cartridge case could be used. Pistols with hairspring triggers, allowed in the world championship, were banned.

Records

Prior to this competition, the existing world and Olympic records were as follows.

No new world or Olympic records were set during the competition.

Schedule

Results

Stewart shot more 10s than de Laval, winning the bronze medal on that tie-breaker.

References

External links
 
 

Shooting at the 1912 Summer Olympics
Men's 1912